Eupithecia signigera is a moth in the family Geometridae. It is found in Japan and Korea.

The wingspan is about 17–19 mm. The ground colour of the fore- and hindwings is reddish brown. Adults are on wing from March to May in one generation per year.

The larvae feed on Abelia spathula, Symplocos chinensis, Pieris japonica, Rhododendron kaempferi and Euonymus alata.

References

Moths described in 1879
signigera
Moths of Asia